Professor S. P. Kothari is an Indian-American academic and the Gordon Y. Billard Professor of Accounting and Finance at the MIT Sloan School of Management and a Padma Shree awardee. His field of research is strategic and policy issues, securities regulation, auditing, and corporate governance.

Professor Kothari has senior executive experience in government, academia, and industry. Most recently, he served as Chief Economist and Director of the Division of Economic and Risk Analysis at the US Securities and Exchange Commission from 2019 to 2021.

He is also the editor of the Journal of Accounting and Economics. During 2008-2009, he was Global Head of Equity Research, Barclays Global Investors, acquired by BlackRock on June 11, 2009. Prior to 2008, he was also Deputy Dean and the head of the department of Economics, Finance and Accounting.

Kothari earned his B.E. in Chemical Engineering from the Birla Institute of Technology and Science, Pilani, his M.B.A. from the Indian Institute of Management Ahmedabad, and his Ph.D. from the University of Iowa.

He was awarded the Padma Shri in 2020.

References

External links
 MIT Sloan faculty page
 Faculty page at MIT
 SEC Bio

Indian Institute of Management Ahmedabad alumni
Year of birth missing (living people)
Living people
Indian emigrants to the United States
University of Iowa alumni
Birla Institute of Technology and Science, Pilani alumni
MIT Sloan School of Management faculty
Recipients of the Padma Shri in literature & education
American academics of Indian descent